Porkhovo is the name of several rural localities in Russia:
Porkhovo, Leningrad Oblast, a village under the administrative jurisdiction of Kingiseppskoye Settlement Municipal Formation in Kingiseppsky District of Leningrad Oblast
Porkhovo, Novgorod Oblast, a village under the administrative jurisdiction of the Settlement of Nebolchskoye in Lyubytinsky District of Novgorod Oblast